Libin is a municipality of Wallonia located in the province of Luxembourg, Belgium.

On 1 January 2019 the municipality, which covers 140.5 km2, had 5,223 inhabitants, giving a population density of 37.2 inhabitants per km2.

The municipality consists of the following districts: Anloy, Libin, Ochamps, Redu, Smuid, Transinne, and Villance. Other population centers include: Glaireuse, Hamaide, Lesse, Libin-Bas, Libin-Haut, and Sèchery.

Redu is famous for its bookshops, and for hosting a large European Space Agency ground station. Also in the municipality is the Euro Space Center tourist attraction, close to Transinne.
Sèchery is known as a popular location for marriages and company seminars (e.g. Antwerp Management School,...).

See also
 List of protected heritage sites in Libin

References

External links
 

 
Municipalities of Luxembourg (Belgium)